Erik Sten (born October 1967 in New Haven, Connecticut) is an American politician who served as a member of the Portland City Commission from 1997 to 2008.

Early life and education 
Sten was born in New Haven, Connecticut and raised in Portland, Oregon. He earned a Bachelor of Arts degree in English from Stanford University in 1989.

Career 
In the mid-1990s, Sten was a founding member of X-PAC, a group of politically-minded young citizens, and has participated heavily in the Oregon Bus Project.

Sten was first elected to Position 2 on the Portland City Commission in 1996, defeating Chuck Duffy. He ran successful campaigns for re-election in 1998, 2002, and 2006.

As a Commissioner, Sten was an early supporter of Portland's publicly financed elections system. In 2005, he was named as one of Oregon's 15 most influential people.

He resigned from his position April 4, 2008, and was succeeded by attorney Nick Fish.

After leaving office, Sten relocated to Seattle, Washington. In 2019, it was announced that Sten had joined Strategies 360, a political consulting and lobbying firm, as an advisor.

References 

Living people
1967 births
Stanford University alumni
Portland City Council members (Oregon)
Oregon Democrats
Politicians from New Haven, Connecticut